Mark Schulze was a South African-born German international rugby player who played for both the Germany national rugby union team, which he captained on occasion, and Germany Sevens team from 1996 to 2000.

Schulze attended the German School in Hermannsburg, KwaZulu-Natal and Natal University. He was a member of various  squads before transferring to TSV Victoria Linden in Hanover, with whom he reached the finals of the 1996 and 1997 German Championships.  He later spent a season with RG Heidelberg with whom he reached the finals of the 1999 German Championship.

Schulze represented Germany in the FIRA Tournament from 1996 to 2000, Rugby World Cup qualification matches and in the European Nations Cup.

He was also a member of the Germany Sevens team, which reached the Plate Final of the 1997 Punta Del Este Sevens, won the Bowl Final of the 1997 Paris Sevens, and contested the Bowl Final of the 2000 IRB World Sevens tournament in Punta del Este.

He retired from rugby after the German Rugby Federation Centenary Match against the Barbarians in 2000.

Honours

Club
 German rugby union championship - TSV Victoria Linden 1996
 German Rugby Sevens championship - RG Heidelberg 1999

Germany Sevens Team
 Paris Sevens - Air France Bowl 1997

Notes

References 
 "100 Jahre Deutscher Rugby-Verband", Claus-Peter Bach, 2000
 "10 anos de Seven en Punta del Este", Pedro Bordaberry, British Schools Old Boys Club, 1999
 "Champagne Rugby", John Blondin, The National Publishing Group Pty Limited, 1997, 

German rugby union players
People from KwaZulu-Natal
Year of birth missing (living people)
Living people
Rugby union scrum-halves